The 2008 Korea National League was the sixth season of the Korea National League. It was divided in two stages, and the top two clubs of the overall table qualified for the championship playoffs in addition to the winners of each stage.

Regular season

First stage

Second stage

Overall table

Championship playoffs

Bracket

Semi-finals

Final

2–2 on aggregate. Hyundai Mipo Dockyard won 5–4 on penalties.

Top scorers
This list includes goals of the championship playoffs. The official top goalscorer was decided with records of only regular season, and Kim Young-hoo won the award with 30 goals.

Awards

Main awards

Source:

Best XI

Source:

See also
 2008 in South Korean football
 2008 Korea National League Championship
 2008 Korean FA Cup

References

External links

 

Korea National League seasons
K